The Australian state of Victoria has a number of defunct energy supply and distribution utility companies.

The North Melbourne Electric Tramways and Lighting Company
The North Melbourne Electric Tramways and Lighting Company operated an electric tramway system beginning in 1906, with the network being based upon the suburb of Essendon. The company also supplied electric power to the neighbouring suburbs from its power station on Mount Alexander Road, near the intersection with South Street. The power generation side of the company was acquired by the State Electricity Commission of Victoria in 1922, when its 15-year franchise expired, and the tram side was acquired by the Melbourne & Metropolitan Tramways Board on 21 December 1922.

Melbourne Electric Supply Company

The Melbourne Electric Supply Company was registered in 1899 as the Electric Lighting and Traction Company of Australia, led by F. W. Clements and assisted by Herbert Reah Harper. The company's records go back to 1892. It was registered in England, and started supplying power to Melbourne and Geelong before purchasing the South Australian Electric Light and Motive Power Company in Adelaide and Port Adelaide, in the colony of South Australia. The company was renamed to the Melbourne Electric Supply Company in 1908. The company operated the Richmond and Geelong power stations. In July 1910, it was granted a 30-year lease to operate the electric tramway system in Geelong. The company was acquired by the State Electricity Commission of Victoria in 1930, before the expiration of the 30-year franchise of the electricity business.

Electric Supply Company of Victoria
The Electric Supply Company of Victoria was a British company with its headquarters in the English city of Liverpool. It was formed in 1903 as a subsidiary of the British Insulated Wire Company. The company operated power stations and electric tramways in the regional cities of Bendigo and Ballarat. The Electric Supply Company of Victoria was acquired by the State Electricity Commission of Victoria in 1934, when its 30-year franchise expired.

Metropolitan Gas Company

The Metropolitan Gas Company was set up for the supply of town gas to the city of Melbourne. it was absorbed into the Gas and Fuel Corporation of Victoria in 1951.

Ballarat Gas Company
The Ballarat Gas Company was set up to supply town gas to the city of Ballarat in 1857. The company was wound up upon the introduction of natural gas to Ballarat in early 1970s.

Geelong Gas Company

The Geelong Gas Company was set up to supply town gas to the city of Geelong in 1858. It was purchased by the Gas and Fuel Corporation of Victoria in 1971 when natural gas was introduced to the city.

State Electricity Commission of Victoria

The State Electricity Commission of Victoria was a state owned utility established in 1919 to manage the generation and distribution of electricity in Victoria, as well as to maintain and operate the three provincial electric tramways acquired from the Electric Supply Company of Victoria Ltd. (Ballarat and Bendigo) and the Melbourne Electric Supply Company Ltd (Geelong). The commission was split into three parts in 1993: generation, transmission, and retail. In 1994 these parts were again split and later privatised.

Gas and Fuel Corporation of Victoria

The Gas and Fuel Corporation of Victoria was established in 1950. It took over two of the three main gas utilities in Melbourne - the Metropolitan Gas Company and the Brighton Gas Company, and over time acquired the other local gas authorities and private gas companies. As part of the conversion to natural gas, in 1971 the G&FC acquired the Geelong Gas Company, one of only two remaining private gas companies in Victoria at the time. The Ballarat Gas Company closed at the time. The G&FC was disaggregated in the 1990s, privatised and wound up in June 1995.

References

Energy companies of Australia
 
Utility companies in Victoria, Australia
Economic history of Victoria (Australia)
Energy in Victoria (Australia)